Vincent Kearney is an Irish journalist. He is the current Northern Ireland Editor for RTÉ News since 2021. He previously was Northern Correspondent for RTÉ News from 2019 to 2021, and worked for BBC Northern Ireland, The Sunday Times and the Belfast Telegraph for 32 years.

Career
Prior to joining Raidió Teilifís Éireann (RTÉ), Kearney worked as a reporter and producer for daily news and documentaries for the BBC, including 4 years with BBC Northern Ireland's Spotlight programme. During his 32 years of experience, Kearney was Home Affairs Correspondent for BBC Northern Ireland, Northern Ireland Correspondent with The Sunday Times and also a journalist for the Belfast Telegraph for 9 years. Kearney joined RTÉ in January 2019 as Northern Ireland Correspondent, where he reported across all of RTÉ's flagship news programmes, providing television, radio and online coverage.

Kearney succeeded Tommie Gorman as Northern Ireland Editor for RTÉ News in April 2021.

Personal life
Kearney was born in West Belfast, Northern Ireland. He is married to Louise Kearney for 30 years and have 4 children, Vince, Ronan, Niall and Megan. They currently reside in Lurgan, County Armagh.

References

Living people
RTÉ newsreaders and journalists
Journalists from Belfast
The Sunday Times people
Year of birth missing (living people)